The Hotel Boulderado is located at 13th and Spruce St. in downtown Boulder, Colorado.  It opened its doors on New Year's Day 1909.  The original 1908 Otis Elevator is still in operation.

As one of the first Boulder hotels, it is located in the heart of downtown. The hotel's name comes from the words "Boulder" and "Colorado" so no guest would forget where they had stayed. The hotel is listed on the National Register of Historic Places.

Hotel Boulderado is a member of Historic Hotels of America, the official program of the National Trust for Historic Preservation.

The Hotel Boulderado houses three restaurants. Located off of the main lobby are Spruce Farm and Fish, a fine-dining restaurant, and the Corner Bar, a more casual eatery. The basement contains a speakeasy-style bar, License  No. 1, which recently replaced Catacombs. All three restaurants share a kitchen.

The Hotel Boulderado appears in Stephen King's novel Misery.

History
In 1905, Boulder was home to 8,000 residents, the University of Colorado, one of the Chautauqua cultural and educational resorts, and twenty-six automobiles. Residents called the city the "Athens of the West." As a new-forged railroad hub, the city did have some hotels to accommodate visitors, but in December 1905, the city council launched the "hotel proposition," furthered by the Boulder newspaper, the Daily Camera. Committees from Boulder's Commercial Association raised funds in the form of $100 subscriptions, and the Boulder Hotel Company was formed, which owned the hotel until 1939.

The hotel was opened with a Gala Ball on New Year's Eve of 1908. The first guests checked in on New Years Day, 1909. The first guest register is still on display in the main lobby, and the modern hotel still commemorates their opening every year with a New Year's Eve Gala Ball, voted the #1 Place to Celebrate New Year's Eve by Downtown Boulder readers.

Ghost Sightings
It is said that Room 347 at Hotel Boulderado is haunted and has had many ghost sightings throughout the years.  Many guests have complained that the water has turned on sporadically throughout the night.

See also
National Register of Historic Places listings in Boulder County, Colorado

References

External links

 Hotel Boulderado official site
 Historian Silvia Pettem's history of the hotel

Hotel buildings completed in 1909
Hotel buildings on the National Register of Historic Places in Colorado
Buildings and structures in Boulder, Colorado
National Register of Historic Places in Boulder County, Colorado
Downtown Boulder Historic District
Historic Hotels of America
Reportedly haunted locations in Colorado